

Gerhard Heinrich Lindemann (2 August 1896 – 28 April 1994) was a German general (Generalmajor) in the Wehrmacht during World War II, and a recipient of the Knight's Cross of the Iron Cross with Oak Leaves, awarded by Nazi Germany for successful military leadership.

Lindemann surrendered to the Red Army in the course of the Soviet July 1944 Lvov–Sandomierz Offensive. Convicted as a war criminal in the Soviet union, he was held until 1955.

Awards and decorations
 Iron Cross (1914) 2nd Class (5 October 1915) & 1st Class (25 April 1918)
 Honour Cross of the World War 1914/1918
 Clasp to the Iron Cross (1939) 2nd Class & 1st Class (10 June 1940)
 German Cross in Gold on 7 March 1942 as Oberstleutnant in 216th Infantry Regiment
 Knight's Cross of the Iron Cross with Oak Leaves
 Knight's Cross on 25 January 1943 as Oberst and commander of 216th Infantry Regiment
 580th Oak Leaves on 10 September 1944 as Generalmajor and acting divisional commander of  361st Infantry Division

References

Citations

Bibliography

 
 
 
 

1896 births
1994 deaths
People from Verden an der Aller
Major generals of the German Army (Wehrmacht)
German Army personnel of World War I
Recipients of the clasp to the Iron Cross, 1st class
Recipients of the Gold German Cross
Recipients of the Knight's Cross of the Iron Cross with Oak Leaves
German prisoners of war in World War II held by the Soviet Union
People from the Province of Hanover
Military personnel from Lower Saxony
German Army generals of World War II